Haygarden is a small village in the town of Richmond in the U.S. state of Rhode Island. Located in the eastern portion of town near Rhode Island Route 138 (Kingstown Road), it is west of the village of Usquepaug but east of the town center of Richmond.

Overview
The village area stretches between Heaton Orchard Road and Beaver River Road. The Richmond Airport, a small airport which is designated to the nearby village of West Kingston, is also located in Haygarden.

Residents of Haygarden use the postal codes "02892" , or West Kingston, Rhode Island, and “02812” Carolina, Rhode Island

References

Villages in Washington County, Rhode Island
Villages in Rhode Island